Iyad Sami Saleh Al-Khatib is a retired Jordanian football player who played as a midfielder for Al-Ramtha and Jordan U-22.

International goals

None-International Goals

References
 Al-Khatib: "My Ambition is to Catch Up With Stardom By Playing With Al-Nashama and Competing in the U-22 Asian Cup"

External links 
 
 Eyad Al-Khateeb on Facebook

1992 births
Living people
Jordanian footballers
Jordan youth international footballers
Association football forwards
Al-Ramtha SC players
Jordanian Pro League players